George Walter Canning (23 August 1889 – 17 June 1955) was a British tug of war competitor who competed in the 1920 Summer Olympics. In 1920 he won the gold medal as member of the British team. He was part of the City of London Police which he worked for until 1935.

References

External links
profile

1889 births
1955 deaths
Olympic tug of war competitors of Great Britain
Tug of war competitors at the 1920 Summer Olympics
Olympic gold medallists for Great Britain
Olympic medalists in tug of war
Medalists at the 1920 Summer Olympics
City of London Police officers